Marthe Mellot (16 February 1870 - 13 August 1947) was a French film actress.

Marthe Mellot was born in Cosne-Cours-sur-Loire, Nièvre, France, and died in Paris.

Selected filmography
 Feu Mathias Pascal (1925)
 The Red Robe (1933)
 The Two Orphans (1933)
 Les Misérables (1934)
 The Last Billionaire (1934)
 Miquette (1934)
 Madame Bovary (1934)
    (1935)
 Woman of Malacca (1937)
 The Citadel of Silence (1937)
 Girls in Distress (1939)
 Thérèse Martin (1939)
 Serenade (1940)
 The Blue Veil (1942)
 Land Without Stars (1946)
 A Cage of Nightingales (1945) 
 The Scarlet Bazaar (1947)
 The Lost Village (1947)

References

External links

1870 births
1947 deaths
French stage actresses
French film actresses
French silent film actresses
People from Nièvre
20th-century French actresses